USTC may mean:

Universal Short Title Catalogue
University of Science and Technology of China
Union of Central African Workers (Union Syndicale des Travailleurs de Centrafrique)
University of Science & Technology Chittagong
United Shipping & Trading Company, a conglomerate in shipping and other fields
United Sports Training Center
United State of Travancore and Cochin
United States Tax Court
United States Training Center